Ruth Colvin Starrett McGuire (1893–1950) was an American plant pathologist. She studied sugar cane diseases and sugarbeets.

Early life and education

Ruth McGuire was born in 1893. She earned her B.A. in 1914 and her M.A. in 1916, both from Indiana University Bloomington. After earning her Master's, she worked as a high school teacher for three years. She never earned her Ph.D. but she took classes at numerous other schools including George Washington University, Northwestern University, and the University of Maryland.

Career

McGuire started work at the United States Department of Agriculture. She retired with the title of Associate Cytologist. She did not stop working after retirement. She served as a research associate at the California Academy of Science from 1931 until 1942. While there, she studied the relationships between birds and insects. As also studied researcher, she studied sugarcane, sugarbeets, bees, silkworms, beetles and mosquitoes. McGuire was a member of the Botanical Society of Washington, the Entomological Society of America, and the International Society of Sugar Cane Technologists.

Later life
McGuire is buried at Arlington National Cemetery.

Further reading
McGuire, Ruth C. and Ernst Artschwager. "Contribution to the morphology and anatomy of the Russian dandelion (Taraxacum Kok-saghyz)." Technical Bulletin. United States Department of Agriculture: 24.

References

External links

1893 births
1950 deaths
American phytopathologists
American women botanists
Women phytopathologists
History of sugar
United States Department of Agriculture people
Indiana University Bloomington alumni
20th-century American botanists
20th-century American women scientists
20th-century agronomists